Eterusia is a genus of moths of the family Zygaenidae.

Species
Eterusia aedea
Eterusia alompra
Eterusia angustifascia
Eterusia culoti
Eterusia dubernardi
Eterusia fasciata
Eterusia formosibia
Eterusia joiceyi
Eterusia lacreuzei
Eterusia lativitta
Eterusia ni
Eterusia obscurascens
Eterusia proprimarginata
Eterusia raja
Eterusia repleta
Eterusia scintillans
Eterusia subcyanea
Eterusia sublutea
Eterusia subnigra
Eterusia sulphurea
Eterusia taiwana
Eterusia toxopei
Eterusia tricolor
Eterusia trimacula
Eterusia urania
Eterusia venus
Eterusia watanabei

Chalcosiinae
Zygaenidae genera